Clintonville, also known as Indigo Head, is an unincorporated community in Coffee County, Alabama, United States.

History
The community was originally called Indigo Head, due to the indigo plants in the area. The name was later changed to Clintonville, in honor of the local Clinton family. A post office operated under the name Clintonville from 1860 to 1921.

The Clintonville Male and Female Academy operated as the first school in Coffee County to teach beyond the sixth grade. The Alabama Legislature chartered the school on January 11, 1860, and repealed the charter on March 28, 1873.

Company F (known as "The Covington and Coffee Grays") of the 33rd Regiment Alabama Infantry was organized at Clintonville in March 1862 by Captain Daniel Horn. A portion of the 15th Regiment Alabama Infantry also came from Clintonville.

References

Unincorporated communities in Coffee County, Alabama
Unincorporated communities in Alabama